Persiaran Tujuan is a main road in Subang Jaya, Selangor, Malaysia. The road connects Subang Jaya west interchange at Federal Highway (Federal Route 2) to Persiaran Kewajipan. It is one of the busiest roads in UEP Subang Jaya during rush hour from/to Kuala Lumpur. It is an alternative route to Persiaran Kewajipan for motorists to avoid traffic congestion.

During workdays or peak hours, there are restricted routes along Persiaran Tujuan. Heavy vehicles (except buses and tankers) with laden and unladen heavy vehicles weighing 10,000 kg or more are not allowed to enter these routes between 6:30 am until 9:30 am on Monday to Friday (except public holidays). A compound fine will be issued to heavy vehicles that flout the rule.

List of junctions

Highways in Malaysia